Eiki Berg (born 13 January 1970) is an Estonian political scientist, professor of the theory of international relations at the University of Tartu, and politician.

Berg was a member of the X Riigikogu, representing the Res Publica Party.

References

Living people
1970 births
Estonian educators
Estonian political scientists
Res Publica Party politicians
Members of the Riigikogu, 2003–2007
University of Tartu alumni
Academic staff of the University of Tartu